Rodez Aveyron Football (commonly referred to as le Raf or simply Rodez) is a French association football club based in Rodez. The club was founded in 1929 and currently plays in Ligue 2, the second level of French football. The club plays its home matches at the Stade Paul Lignon located within the city. The women's squad was founded in 1993 and are known as the Rafettes. They play in the Division 1 Féminine, the top division in France.

From 1988–1993, Rodez played in Ligue 2, and on 11 April 2019 secured promotion back to this level after 26 years in the lower divisions.

Players

Current squad

Out on loan

Reserve squad

Notable players
For a list of former Rodez players, see :Category:Rodez AF players.

Staff
Management
 Chairman: Pierre-Olivier Murat
 General Manager: Grégory Ursule

Sports
 Head Coach:  Laurent Peyrelade
 Goalkeeper Coach: David Manhaval

Honours
Division 3
Runners-up (1): 1990
Winners (3): 1988 (Southwest group), 1990 (Central West group), 2018–19
Championnat de France amateur
Winners (1): 2007 (Group C)
Championnat de France amateur 2
Winners (1): 2004 (Group F)
Division 4
Winners (1): 1984 (Group G)
Division d'Honneur (Midi-Pyrénées)
Champions (3): 1956, 1969, 1982

References

 
1929 establishments in France
Association football clubs established in 1929
Sport in Aveyron
Football clubs in Occitania (administrative region)